Lithium chlorate is the inorganic chemical compound with the formula LiClO3.
Like all chlorates, it is an oxidizer and may become unstable and possibly explosive if mixed with organic materials, reactive metal powders, or sulfur.

It can be manufactured by the reaction of hot, concentrated lithium hydroxide with chlorine:

3 Cl2 + 6 LiOH → 5 LiCl + LiClO3 + 3 H2O

Lithium chlorate has a very high solubility in water.  It is also a six-electron oxidant. Its electrochemical reduction is facilitated by acid, electrocatalysts and redox mediators.  These properties make lithium chlorate a useful oxidant for high energy density flow batteries. Lithium chlorate has a very low melting point for an inorganic ionic salt.

References

Chlorates
Lithium salts
Oxidizing agents